The Arizona Superintendent of Public Instruction is an elected state executive position in the Arizona state government. The superintendent oversees the state of Arizona's public school system and directs the state's Department of Education.

The current superintendent is Tom Horne.

The Superintendent of Public Instruction is fourth (behind the Secretary of State, Attorney General, and Treasurer, respectively) in the line of succession to the office of Governor of Arizona.

The Superintendent of Public Education is an ex officio member of the Arizona Board of Regents which oversees public universities in the state.

Arizona's Superintendent of Public Instruction is the lowest paid state education administrator in the United States, being paid $85,000 compared to the national average of $174,000.

Superintendents

References

External links
 Official Website
 The Historical Role of Arizona's Superintendent of Public Instruction

Government of Arizona
Public education in Arizona